Ransley Samuel Thacker  (1891 – 3 January 1966) was a British lawyer and judge. Employed in the colonial service, he served as Chief Justice of St Vincent (1931–1933), Attorney General of Fiji (1933-1938), and as a judge in British Kenya. He is best known for the jailing of Jomo Kenyatta.

Legal and political career
In the early 1930s, Thacker served as Chief Justice of St Vincent, and was serving in that role as of 7 July 1933.

Thacker took up the post of Attorney General of Fiji at the end of 1933, passing through Sydney en route to Suva on 21 December.

Thacker served as judge on the Supreme Court of British Kenya from 1938 to 1950. He retired to Nairobi on a £474 pension, which he supplemented by practicing law. He was called out of retirement on 17 November 1952, however, as a First Class Magistrate to preside over the trial of the Kapenguria Six — Jomo Kenyatta and five others accused of organizing the Mau Mau movement. On 8 April 1953, Thacker sentenced them to seven years' hard labour. In his summing up, Thacker declared:

He added:

Kenyatta remained imprisoned until 14 April 1959, and his civil rights were not fully restored until August 1961.

Personal life
Thacker was the son of Henry Thacker and Eliza Jackson.

In 1915, Thacker married Olive Frances Braithwaite in London. They had three children, Daphne Elinor (born 1917), Derek (born c.1919) and Derwent Allan (born 1921).

References

1891 births
1966 deaths
Attorneys General of the Colony of Fiji
Attorneys-general of Fiji
Members of the Legislative Council of Fiji
Chief justices of Saint Vincent and the Grenadines
British Kenya judges
British Windward Islands judges
People from Nottingham
British expatriates in Fiji
English King's Counsel
20th-century English lawyers